Tom Harper is a British actor.

Early life and education
Tom Harper, the actor (not to be confused with the director of the same name) was born in 1977. His full name is Thomas L. Harper. He attended the Webber Douglas Academy of Dramatic Art in London, England.

Career
Harper has appeared in over a dozen films and more than ten television productions. His first screen role was as Acastus in Jason and the Argonauts (2000), a two-part, fantasy-adventure television film. Harper has since appeared in other television productions including episodes of the television series Agatha Christie's Poirot, Foyle's War, Silent Witness, Midsomer Murders, and Spooks: Code 9.

His film work includes appearing in The Upside of Anger (2005) and  Telstar: The Joe Meek Story (2008).

References

Bibliography

External links
 

1977 births
British male film actors
British male television actors
Living people